The peopling of India refers to the migration of Homo sapiens into the Indian subcontinent. Anatomically modern humans settled India in multiple waves of early migrations, over tens of millennia. The first migrants came with the Coastal Migration/Southern Dispersal 65,000 years ago, whereafter complex migrations within south and southeast Asia took place. West-Asian (Iranian) hunter-gatherers migrated to South Asia after the Last Glacial Period but before the onset of farming. Together with a minor number of ancient South Asian hunter-gatherers they formed the population of the Indus Valley civilisation (IVC).

With the decline of the IVC, and the migration of Indo-Europeans, the IVC-people contributed to the formation of both the Ancestral North Indians ("ANI"), who were closely related to contemporary West-Eurasians, and the Ancestral South Indians ("ASI"), who were descended predominantly from the Southeastern Indian hunter gatherers (known as "AASI", who were distantly related to East-Eurasians such as Andamanese, Aboriginal Australians, and East Asians), but also from West-Eurasian hunter gatherers from the region of Iran. These two ancestral populations (ASI and ANI) mixed extensively between 1,900-4,200 years ago, after the fall of the IVC and their respective southward migration, and created the peoples inhabiting the Indian subcontinent today, while the migrations of the Munda people and the Sino-Tibetan speaking people from East Asia also added new elements.

First modern human settlers

Pre- or post-Toba
The dating of the earliest successful migration of modern humans out of Africa is a matter of dispute. It may have pre- or post-dated the Toba catastrophe, a volcanic super eruption that took place between 69,000 and 77,000 years ago at the site of present-day Lake Toba. According to Michael Petraglia, stone tools discovered below the layers of ash deposits in India at Jwalapuram, Andhra Pradesh point to a pre-Toba dispersal. The population who created these tools is not known with certainty as no human remains were found. An indication for post-Toba is haplogroup L3, that originated before the dispersal of humans out of Africa, and can be dated to 60,000–70,000 years ago, "suggesting that humanity left Africa a few thousand years after Toba."

Impact
It has been hypothesized that the Toba supereruption about 74,000 years ago destroyed much of India's central forests, covering it with a layer of volcanic ash, and may have brought humans worldwide to a state of near-extinction by suddenly plunging the planet into an ice-age that could have lasted for up to 1,800 years. If true, this may "explain the apparent bottleneck in human populations that geneticists believe occurred between 50,000 and 100,000 years ago" and the relative "lack of genetic diversity among humans alive today".

Since the Toba event is believed to have had such a harsh impact and "specifically blanketed the Indian subcontinent in a deep layer of ash", it was "difficult to see how India's first colonists could have survived this greatest of all disasters". Therefore, it was believed that all humans previously present in India went extinct during, or shortly after, this event and these first Indians left "no trace of their DNA in present-day humans" – a theory seemingly backed by genetic studies.

Pre-Toba tools
Research published in 2009 by a team led by Michael Petraglia of the University of Oxford suggested that some humans may have survived the hypothesized catastrophe on the Indian mainland. Undertaking "Pompeii-like excavations" under the layer of Toba ash, the team discovered tools and human habitations from both before and after the eruption. However, human fossils have not been found from this period, and nothing is known of the ethnicity of these early humans in India. Recent research also by Macauly et al. (2005) and Posth et al. (2016), also argue for a post-Toba dispersal.
Early Stone Age hominin fossils have been found in the Narmada valley of Madhya Pradesh. Some have been dated to 200- 700,000 BP. It is uncertain what species they represent.

Post-Toba Southern Coastal dispersal

By some 70-50,000 years ago, only a small group, possibly as few as 150 to 1,000 people, crossed the Red Sea. The group that crossed the Red Sea travelled along the coastal route around the coast of Arabia and Persia until reaching India, which appears to be the first major settling point. The Aborigines of Australia, Wells says, are the descendants of the first wave of migrations.

The oldest definitively identified Homo sapiens fossils yet found in South Asia are Balangoda man. Named for the location in Sri Lanka where they were discovered, they are at least 28,000 years old.

The predominant majority genome markers of South Asians are all closely related to West-Eurasians and may have either originated in Western Asia or South Asia itself. Evidence for West-Eurasian ancestry dates back to about 40,000 years ago. It is argued that an early Paleolithic population contributed to both Europeans and Aboriginal Australians, outgoing from India. It is suggested that "Caucasoid" phenotype originated among an early Indian population which later massively expanded all over Eurasia.

AASI
Narasimhan et al. (2018) introduced the term AASI, "Ancient Ancestral South Indian" (AASI) for these oldest human inhabitants, which were possibly distantly related to the common ancestors of East-Eurasians such as Andaman Islanders (such as the Onge), East Asians, and Australian Aboriginals. According to Narasimhan et al. (2019), "essentially all the ancestry of present-day eastern and southern Asians (prior to West Eurasian-related admixture in southern Asians) derives from a hypothetical single eastward spread, which gave rise in a short span of time to the lineages leading to AASI, East Asians, Onge, and Australians.", a lineage often referred to as "East-Eurasians".

Relation to Andaman Islanders

Several genetic studies have found evidence of a distant common ancestry between native Andaman Islanders and the AASI/ASI ancestral component found in South Asians. Modern South Asians have not been found to carry the paternal lineages common in the Andamanese, which has been suggested to indicate that certain paternal lineages may have become extinct in India, or that they may be very rare and have not yet been sampled. Chaubey and Endicott (2013) further noted that  "Overall, the Andamanese are more closely related to Southeast Asian Negritos than they are to present-day South Asians."

Shinde et al. 2019 found either Andamanese or East Siberian hunter-gatherers fit as proxy for AASI "due to shared ancestry deeply in time." According to Yelmen et al. (2019) the native South Asian genetic component (AASI) is distinct from the Andamanese and not closely related, and that the Andamanese are thus an imperfect and imprecise proxy for AASI. According to Yelmen et al, the Andamanese component (represented by the Andamanese Onge) was not detected in the northern Indian Gujarati, and thus it is suggested that the South Indian tribal Paniya people (who are believed to be of largely AASI ancestry) would serve as a better proxy than the Andamanese (Onge) for the "native South Asian" component in modern South Asians.

According to Narasimhan et al. (2019), the "AASI" component in South Asians shares a common root with the Andamanese (as exemplified by the Onge) and is distantly related to the Onge (Andamanese), as well as to East Asians, and Aboriginal Australians (with those groups and the AASI sharing a deep ancestral split around the same time), which would place them in the East-Eurasian lineage.

Relation to "Negritos"

The present-day Andamese are considered to be part of the "Negritos", several diverse ethnic groups who inhabit isolated parts of southeast Asia. Based on their physical similarities, Negritos were once considered a single population of related people, but the appropriateness of using the label 'Negrito' to bundle together peoples of different ethnicity based on similarities in stature and complexion has been challenged. Recent research suggests that the Negritos include several separate groups, as well as demonstrating that they are not closely related to the Pygmies of Africa.

According to Vishwanathan et al. (2004), the typical "negrito" features could also have been developed by convergent evolution. According to Gyaneshwer Chaubey and Endicott (2013), "At the current level of genetic resolution, however, there is no evidence of a single ancestral population for the different groups traditionally defined as 'negritos'." Basu et al. 2016 concluded that the Andamanese have a distinct ancestry and are not closely related to other South Asians, but are closer to Southeast Asian Negritos, indicating that South Asian peoples do not descend directly from "Negritos" as such.

Sri Lankan Vedda

Groups ancestral to the modern Veddas were probably the earliest inhabitants of Sri Lanka. Their arrival is dated tentatively to about 40,000–35,000 years ago. They are genetically distinguishable from the other peoples of Sri Lanka, and they show a high degree of intra-group diversity. This is consistent with a long history of existing as small subgroups undergoing significant genetic drift.

A 2013 study by Raghavan et al. showed that the Vedda are closely related to other groups in Sri Lanka and India, especially to Sinhalese and Tamils. They additionally found deep relations between the indigenous Vedda and other South Asian populations with the modern populations of Europe, the Middle East and Northern Africa, pointing to an shared origin possibly within the Indian Subcontinent and a dispersal outgoing from India.

Latest Glacial Maximum

After the Last Glacial Period, human populations started to grow and migrate. With the invention of agriculture, the so-called Neolithic revolution, larger numbers of people could be sustained. The use of metals (copper, bronze, iron) further changed human ways of life, giving an initial advance to early users, and aiding further migrations, and admixture.

According to Silva et al. (2017), multiple waves of migration from western Eurasia took place after the last Ice Age, both before and after the advent of farming in South Asia. According to Narasimhan et al. (2019), people related to Iranian hunter-gatherers were present in South Asia before the advent of farming. They mixed with Ancestral Ancient South Asians (AASI) to form the Indus Valley population. With the decline of the IVC after 1900 BCE and the arrival of the Indo-Aryans, IVC-people mixed with incoming Indo-Aryans, forming the Ancestral North Indians (ANI). Other IVC-people mixed with AASI forming the Ancestral South Indians (ASI).

These two ancestral groups mixed in India between 4,200 and 1,900 years ago (2200 BCE – 100 CE), whereafter a shift to endogamy took place, possibly by the enforcement of "social values and norms" during the Hindu Gupta rule. Reich et al. stated that "ANI ancestry ranges from 39–71% in India, and is higher in traditionally upper caste, martial races and Indo-European speakers.
".

Basu et al. (2016) note that mainland India harbors two additional distinct ancestral components which have contributed to the gene pools of the Indian subcontinent, namely Ancestral Austro-Asiatic (AAA) and Ancestral Tibeto-Burman (ATB).

Pre-Indo Aryan West Eurasian ancestry

Pre-farming Iranian hunter-gatherers

Narasimhan et al. (2019) and Shinde et al. (2019) conclude that west Eurasian ancestry was already present before the advent of farming in South Asia.

Metspalu et al. (2011) detected a genetic component in India, k5, which "distributed across the Indus Valley, Central Asia, and the Caucasus". According to Metspalu et al. (2011), k5 "might represent the genetic vestige of the ANI", though they also note that the geographic cline of this component within India "is very weak, which is unexpected under the ASI-ANI model", explaining that the ASI-ANI model implies an ANI contribution which decreases toward southern India. According to Metspalu et al. (2011), "regardless of where this component was from (the Caucasus, Near East, Indus Valley, or Central Asia), its spread to other regions must have occurred well before our detection limits at 12,500 years."

Speaking to Fountain Ink, Metspalu said, "the West Eurasian component in Indians appears to come from a population that diverged genetically from people actually living in Eurasia, and this separation happened at least 12,500 years ago." Moorjani et al. (2013) refer to Metspalu (2011) as "fail[ing] to find any evidence for shared ancestry between the ANI and groups in West Eurasia within the past 12,500 years". CCMB researcher Thangaraj believes that "it was much longer ago", and that "the ANI came to India in a second wave of migration that happened perhaps 40,000 years ago."

Possible migration of Iranian neolithic farmers
According to Gallego Romero et al. (2011), their research on lactose tolerance in India suggests that "the west Eurasian genetic contribution identified by Reich et al. (2009) principally reflects gene flow from Iran and the Middle East." Gallego Romero notes that Indians who are lactose-tolerant show a genetic pattern regarding this tolerance which is "characteristic of the common European mutation." According to Romero, this suggests that "the most common lactose tolerance mutation made a two-way migration out of the Middle East less than 10,000 years ago. While the mutation spread across Europe, another explorer must have brought the mutation eastward to India – likely traveling along the coast of the Persian Gulf where other pockets of the same mutation have been found."

According to Broushaki et al. (2016), evidence indicates that the neolithic farmer component forms the main ancestry of many modern South Asians. These neolithic farmers migrated from the fertile crescent, most likely from a region near the Zagros mountains in modern day Iran, to South Asia some 10,000 years ago.

Mehrgarh (7000 BCE to c. 2500 BCE), to the west of the Indus River valley,  is a precursor of the Indus Valley Civilisation, whose inhabitants migrated into the Indus Valley and became the Indus Valley Civilisation. It is one of the earliest sites with evidence of farming and herding in South Asia. According to Lukacs and Hemphill, while there is a strong continuity between the neolithic and chalcolithic (Copper Age) cultures of Mehrgarh, dental evidence shows that the chalcolithic population did not descend from the neolithic population of Mehrgarh, which "suggests moderate levels of gene flow." They further noted that "the direct lineal descendents of the Neolithic inhabitants of Mehrgarh are to be found to the south and the east of Mehrgarh, in northwestern India and the western edge of the Deccan plateau", with neolithic Mehrgarh showing greater affinity with chalcolithic Inamgaon, south of Mehrgarh, than with chalcolithic Mehrgarh.

Elamite-Dravidian hypothesis 

While the IVC has been linked to the early Dravidian peoples, some scholars have suggested that their neolithic farmer predecessors may have migrated from the Zagros mountains to northern South Asia some 10,000 years ago. According to David McAlpin, the Dravidian languages were brought to India by immigration into India from Elam. Franklin Southworth also states that the Dravidian Languages originated in western Iran and that publications and research are "further evidence of [the relationship between Dravidian languages and Elamite] viability". According to Renfrew and Cavalli-Sforza, proto-Dravidian was brought to India by farmers from the Iranian part of the Fertile Crescent, but more recently Heggerty and Renfrew (2014) noted that "McAlpin's analysis of the language data, and thus his claims, remain far from orthodoxy", adding that Fuller finds no relation of Dravidian language with other languages, and thus assumes it to be native to India. Renfrew and Bahn conclude that several scenarios are compatible with the data, and that "the linguistic jury is still very much out."

Indus Valley civilisation 

Shinde et al. (2019) and Narasimhan et al. (2019), analysing remains from the Indus Valley civilisation (of parts of Bronze Age Northwest India and East Pakistan) and "outliers" from surrounding cultures, conclude that the IVC-population was a mixture people related to Iranian herders and AASI: 

According to Shinde et al. (2019) about 50–98% of the IVC-genome came from people related to early Iranian farmers, and from 2–50% of the IVC-genome came from native South Asian hunter-gatherers sharing a common ancestry with the Andamanese. Narasimhan et al. (2019) found the IVC-genome to consist of 45–82% Iranian farmer-related ancestry and 11–50% AASI (Andamanese-related hunter-gatherer) ancestry. Narasimhan et al. (2019) conclude that the Iranian farmer-related ancestry is related to but distinct from Iranian agri-culturalists, lacking the Anatolian farmer-related ancestry which was common in Iranian farmers after 6000 BCE. Those Iranian farmers-related people may have arrived in India before the advent of farming in northern India, and mixed with people related to Indian hunter-gatherers c. 5400 to 3700 BCE, before the advent of the mature IVC.

The analysed samples of both studies have little to none of the "Steppe ancestry" component associated with later Indo-European migrations into India. The authors found that the respective amounts of those ancestries varied significantly between individuals, and concluded that more samples are needed to get the full picture of Indian population history.

Indo-Aryans

In the second millennium BCE people from the Sintashta culture migrated through Bactria-Margiana culture and into the northern Indian subcontinent (modern day India, Pakistan, Bangladesh and Nepal). The Indo-Aryan migrations started in approximately 1,800 BCE, after the invention of the war chariot, and also brought Indo-Aryan languages into the Levant and possibly Inner Asia. 

The Proto-Indo-Iranians, from which the Indo-Aryans developed, are identified with the Sintashta culture (2100–1800 BCE), and the Andronovo culture, which flourished c. 1800–1400 BCE in the steppes around the Aral sea, present-day Kazakhstan, Uzbekistan and Turkmenistan. The proto-Indo-Iranians were influenced by the Bactria-Margiana culture, south of the Andronovo culture, from which they borrowed their distinctive religious beliefs and practices. The Indo-Aryans split off around 1800–1600 BCE from the Iranians, whereafter the Indo-Aryans migrated into the Levant and north-western India and possibly Inner Asia.

Lazaridis et al. (2016) notes that the demographic impact of steppe related populations on South Asia was substantial and forms a major component in northern India. Lazaridis et al.'s 2016 study estimates 6.5–50.2% steppe related admixture in all modern South Asians with higher caste and Indo-Aryan speaking groups having more steppe admixture than others.

Post-IVC: ANI and ASI ancestral components in the Indian population
A series of studies from 2009 to 2019 have shown that the Indian subcontinent harbours two major ancestral components, formed in the 2nd millennium BCE, namely the Ancestral North Indians (ANI), which is closely related to contemporary West-Eurasians, and the Ancestral South Indians (ASI) which is distinct from any outside population. ANI formed out of a mixture of IVC-people and migrants from the steppe, while ASI was formed out of IVC-people who moved south and mixed further with local hunter-gatherers.

These IVC-people did not carry steppe admixture and were instead a mixture of mostly Neolithic Iran-related ancestry and minor AASI (native South Asian hunter-gatherer) ancestry. According Narasimhan et al. 2019, the genetic makeup of the ASI population consisted of about 73% AASI and about 27% from Iranian-related peoples. This estimate is similar to that of Reich et al., who in 2018 note that the ASI have a West-Eurasian ancestry component (derived from Iranian-related farmers) which Reich estimates at about 25% of their ancestry (not detected in his initial 2009 analysis), with the remaining 75% of the ancestry of the ASI deriving from native South Asian hunter-gatherers.

ANI formed out of a mixture of IVC-people and migrants from Bronze age steppe. Lazaridis et al. (2016) notes that the demographic impact of steppe related populations on South Asia was substantial. According to the results, the Mala, a south Indian Dalit population with minimal Ancestral North Indian (ANI) along the 'Indian Cline' have nevertheless  steppe-related ancestry, showing the strong influence of ANI ancestry in all populations of India. The Kalash of Pakistan are inferred to have  steppe-related ancestry, with the rest being of Iranian farmers ancestry. Reich et al. stated that "ANI ancestry ranges from 39–71% in India, and is higher in traditionally upper caste and Indo-Aryan speakers".

Austroasiatic

According to Ness, there are three broad theories on the origins of the Austroasiatic speakers, namely northeastern India, central or southern China, or southeast Asia. Multiple researches indicate that the Austroasiatic populations in India are derived from (mostly male dominated) migrations from southeast Asia during the Holocene. According to Van Driem (2007), 

According to Chaubey et al. (2011), "AA speakers in India today are derived from dispersal from Southeast Asia, followed by extensive sex-specific admixture with local Indian populations." According to Zhang et al. (2015), Austroasiatic (male) migrations from southeast Asia into India took place after the lates Glacial maximum, circa 4000 years ago. According to Arunkumar et al. (2015), Y-chromosomal haplogroup O2a1-M95, which is typical for Austroasiatic speaking peoples, clearly decreases from Laos to east India, with "a serial decrease in expansion time from east to west", namely "5.7 ± 0.3 Kya in Laos, 5.2 ± 0.6 in Northeast India, and 4.3 ± 0.2 in East India". This suggests "a late Neolithic east to west spread of the lineage O2a1-M95 from Laos".

According to Riccio et al. (2011), the Munda people are likely descended from Austroasiatic migrants from southeast Asia. According to Ness, the Khasi probably migrated into India in the first millennium BCE.

According to a genetic research (2015) including linguistic analyses, suggests an East Asian origin for proto-Austroasiatic groups, which first migrated to Southeast Asia and later into India.

Sino-Tibetan

According to Cordaux et al. (2004), the Sino-Tibetan possibly came from the Himalayan and north-eastern borders of the subcontinent within the past 4,200 years.

The ancient people, who lived in the upper-middle Yellow River basin about 10,000 years ago and developed one of the earliest Neolithic cultures in East Asia, were the ancestors of modern Sino-Tibetan populations. The O-M122 has high frequency (41.8% on average) in East Asians, especially in Han Chinese (52.06% in northern Han and 53.72% in southern Han) and it is generally absent outside East Asia. Haplogroup O2-M122 is primarily found among males of Sino-Tibetan ancestry in the Himalayas and Northeast India and which is generally absent among other linguistic families other than Northeast India. O-M134, a subclade of O-M122, has a high percentage, 86.6%, among Tamangs of Nepal, with similar frequencies, ∼85%, among the northeastern Indian Tibeto-Burman groups, including Adi, Naga, Apatani, and Nyishi. In Assam, Tibeto-Burman expansion throughout Brahmaputra Valley associated with the patrilinial lineage of O-M134 which occurs at a high frequency of 85% in Kachari (Boro Kachari) peoples and 76.5% in Rabha peoples. It has a significant presence among the Khasis (29%), despite being generally absent in other Austroasiatics of India, and it shows up at 55% among the neighbouring Garos, a Tibeto-Burmun group.

A wide variety of Sino-Tibetan languages are spoken on the southern slopes of the Himalayas. Sizable groups that have been identified are the West Himalayish languages of Himachal Pradesh and western Nepal, the Tamangic languages of western Nepal, including Tamang with one million speakers, and the Kiranti languages of eastern Nepal. The remaining groups are small, with several isolates.

The Newar language (Nepal Bhasa) of central Nepal has a million speakers and a literature dating from the 12th century, and nearly a million people speak Magaric languages, but the rest have small speech communities. Other isolates and small groups in Nepal are Dura, Raji–Raute, Chepangic and Dhimalish. Lepcha is spoken in an area from eastern Nepal to western Bhutan. Most of the languages of Bhutan are Bodish, but it also has three small isolates, 'Ole ("Black Mountain Monpa"), Lhokpu and Gongduk and a larger community of speakers of Tshangla.

Crossovers in languages and genetic ancestry

One complication in studying various population groups is that genetic and linguistic affiliations in India only are partially correlated: while the Oraon adivasis have Austric-related ancestry, their language, called Kurukh, is Dravidian. The Nicobarese are considered to be a Mongoloid group, and the Munda and Santals Adivasi are "Austric" groups, but all four speak Austro-Asiatic languages. The Bhils and Gonds Adivasi are frequently classified as "Austric" groups, yet Bhil languages are Indo-European and the Gondi language is Dravidian.

See also 

 Genetics and archaeogenetics of South Asia
 Early Indians
 Early human migrations
 Andamanese
 Irulas
 Indo-Aryan migration hypothesis
 List of R1a frequency by population

Notes

References

Sources 
Printed sources

 
 
 
 
 
 
 
 
 

 
 
 .

 
 
 

 
 
 
 

 

 
 

 

 
 
 

 
 
 

 
 

 
 
 
 

 
 

 

  
 *  
 

 

Web-sources

External links 
Overview
 Akhilesh Pillalamarri, Where Did Indians Come from, part1, part 2, part 3

Genetics
 Tony Joseph (16 June 2017), How genetics is settling the Aryan migration debate, The Hindu
 Tony Joseph (2018), How We, The Indians, Came to Be (summary of Narasimhan (2018)
 Scroll.in, on Narasimhan (2018)
 The Economic Times (12 October 2019), Steppe migration to India was between 3500-4000 years ago: David Reich

Negritos
 thepeoplingofindia.wordpress.com, Negrito

Indigenous peoples of South Asia
History of South Asia
India